The Harborough by-election was a Parliamentary by-election held on 17 June 1904. The constituency returned one Member of Parliament (MP) to the House of Commons of the United Kingdom, elected by the first past the post voting system.

Results

References 

June 1904 events
1904 elections in the United Kingdom
By-elections to the Parliament of the United Kingdom in Leicestershire constituencies